The 1920 Muncie Flyers season was the franchise's inaugural season in the American Professional Football League (APFA)—later named the National Football League. The Flyers entered the season coming off a 4–1–1 record in 1919. Several representatives from the Ohio League wanted to form a new professional league; thus, the APFA was created. The 1920 team only played in one game that counted in the standings: a 45–0 loss against the Rock Island Independents. This game and the Columbus Panhandles–Dayton Triangles on the same date is considered to be the first league game featuring two APFA teams. The Flyers tried to schedule other games, but the opponents canceled to play better teams. As a result, the Flyers had to play the rest of the season's game versus local teams. In week 10, the Flyers won a game against the Muncie Offers More AC for the Muncie City Championship. No players from the 1920 Muncie Flyers were listed on the 1920 All-Pro Team, and no player has been enshrined in the Pro Football Hall of Fame.

Offseason 
The Muncie Flyers, playing as the Muncie Congerville Flyers, finished 4–1–1 as an independent team in 1919. They concluded this season with a win over Avondale AA and won the Muncie City Championship. Representatives of four Ohio League teams—the Canton Bulldogs, the Cleveland Tigers, the Dayton Triangles, and the Akron Pros—called a meeting on August 20, 1920, to discuss the formation of a new, professional league. At the meeting, they tentatively agreed on a salary cap and pledged not to sign college players or players already under contract with other teams. They agreed on a name for the circuit: the American Professional Football Conference.

Earl Ball, the Flyers' manager, heard about this gathering on August 29 and was interested in participating. The original four representatives then invited other professional teams to a second meeting on September 17. At that meeting, held at Bulldogs owner Ralph Hay's Hupmobile showroom in Canton, representatives of the Rock Island Independents, the Flyers, the Decatur Staleys, the Racine Cardinals, the Massillon Tigers, the Chicago Cardinals, and the Hammond Pros agreed to join the league. Representatives of the Buffalo All-Americans and Rochester Jeffersons could not attend the meeting but sent letters to Hay asking to be included in the league. Team representatives changed the league's name slightly to the American Professional Football Association and elected officers, installing Jim Thorpe as president. Under the new league structure, teams created their schedules dynamically as the season progressed, and representatives of each team voted to determine the winner of the APFA trophy.

Regular season 
The Flyers hosted a practice game against the Muncie Tigers on September 26, 1920, but the result of the game is unknown. The Flyers' first game of the season was against the Rock Island Independents. The Independents beat the Flyers 45–0. As a result, the Staleys, who were supposed to play the Flyers the next week, cancelled because they wanted to play a better team. The Flyers tried to schedule game for the next few weeks but were unsuccessful. Since there were no rules to keep players on teams, several Flyers' players left and played for other teams. The Flyers scheduled a game against the Cleveland Tigers three weeks later, but the game was cancelled because the Tigers decided to play against the Panhandles instead. The same result happened next week against the Dayton Triangles. The Flyers were challenged by the Gas City Tigers and Muncie Offers More AC—two teams of Muncie. These games are not counted in the APFA standings.

Schedule 
The table below was compiled using information from The Pro Football Archives and The Coffin Corner, both of which used various contemporary newspapers. A dagger represents a non-APFA team. For the results column, the winning team's score is posted first followed by the result for the Flyers. For the attendance, if a cell is greyed out and has "N/A", then that means there is an unknown figure for that game. The green-colored cells indicates a win; and the red-colored cells indicate a loss. The games against the local teams are listed, but are not counted in the final APFA standings.

Game summaries

Week 2: at Rock Island Independents 

October 3, 1920, at Douglas Park

In their only APFA game counted in the standings, the Muncie Flyers played against the Rock Island Independents. It is considered to be one of the first games played with two APFA teams. Since kickoff times were not standardized, it is unknown if the Muncie–Rock Island or Columbus–Dayton game is the first game. In the first quarter, the Independents scored three touchdowns: two from Arnold Wyman and one from Rube Ursella. In the second quarter, Ursella kicked a 25-yard field goal, and Wyman scored from an 86-yard kickoff return. In the third quarter, Sid Nichols had a 5-yard rushing touchdown, and Waddy Kuehl scored a 7-yard rushing touchdown, en route to a final score of the game was 45–0.

Week 10: at Gas City Tigers 

November 25, 1920, in Gas City, Indiana

It took the Flyers eight weeks in order to have a game played; they accepted the Gas City Tigers' challenge to play in Gas City, Indiana, on November 18. The Tigers were 9–0 and outscored their opponents 443–9 this season. Halfback Mickey Hole scored a 45-yard rushing touchdown three minutes into the game. On the next possession, the Flyers scored again; Kenneth Huffine scored the touchdown, and Cooney Checkaye kicked the point after, which made the score 13–0. Near the beginning of the second quarter, Checkaye scored, but the extra point was missed. The Tigers scored their only touchdown in the game in the third quarter. The final score of the game was 19–7.

Week 10: at Muncie Offers More AC 

November 28, 1920, at Walnut Park

After their first victory of the season, the Flyers were challenged by the Muncie Offers More AC. The game was labelled as the Muncie City Championship. Since most of the other local teams' seasons were finished, both Muncie teams hired as many as 20 players for the game. The field was muddy, which caused Offers More AC to fumble the ball several times. In the third quarter, the Flyers scored two touchdowns to give them a 14–0 lead going into the fourth quarter. The Flyers added 10 more points—a touchdown and a field goal—in the final quarter to win the Championship 24–0.

Week 11: at Gas City Tigers 

December 5, 1920, in Gas City, Indiana

The Flyers last game of the 1920 season was against the Gas City Tigers. The Tigers signed up several players to help them defeat the Flyers. The first quarter was scoreless, as the only near score was from a failed drop kick from the Flyers. The first score of the game came in the second quarter. Weaver of the Tigers returned a punt 85 yards for a touchdown. On the Tigers' next possession, they dropped a pass in the endzone on fourth down. Early in the third quarter, a member of the Tigers fumbled, and the Flyers recovered it on the 5-yard line. Huffine score a rushing touchdown on that possession to tie the game 7–7. The last score of the game came from the Flyers; Checkaye returned a punt 60 yards for a touchdown to give the Flyers a 13–7 victory. The Tigers almost scored on their final possession on the game but fumbled.

Post-season 
Without any APFA wins, the Flyers could not contend for the APFA Championship. However, with wins against the Gas City Tigers and the Muncie Offers More AC, the Flyers claimed to have won the Indiana State Championship. Sportswriter Bruce Copeland compiled the All-Pro list for the 1920 season, but no player from the Flyers was on the list. Ken Huffine decided to be affiliated with the Chicago Stayles after the 1920 season, and Cooney Checkaye took over the role the following season. It did not help, and the Flyers' final year in the APFA was 1921. As of 2012, no players from the 1920 Muncie Flyers have been enshrined into the Pro Football Hall of Fame.

Standings

Roster

Notes

References 
 
 
 
 
 
 
 

Muncie Flyers seasons
Muncie Flyers
1920 in sports in Indiana
National Football League winless seasons